Ravnaja is a village in Serbia. It is situated in the Krupanj municipality, in the Mačva District of Central Serbia. The village had a population of 323 in 2002, all of whom were ethnic Serbs.

Historical population

1948: 700
1953: 732
1961: 630
1971: 560
1981: 456
1991: 389
2002: 323

References

See also
List of places in Serbia

Populated places in Mačva District